The Crystal Axis is the second album from Australian electronic band Midnight Juggernauts. It was released on 28 May 2010. The album was the feature album on Triple J for the week of 24 to 30 May.

Some editions of The Crystal Axis feature a bonus second disc, titled the Surplus Maximus EP featuring remixes, covers and other songs from the album sessions.

At the AIR Awards of 2010, the album won Best Independent Dance/Electronic Album.

Track listing
All tracks written by Midnight Juggernauts (Andrew Szekeres, Vincent Vendetta and Daniel Stricker).

References

2010 albums
Midnight Juggernauts albums